USS Porter may refer to one of several ships in the United States Navy named in honor of Commodore David Porter, and his son, Admiral David Dixon Porter.

 , a torpedo boat, launched in 1896, served during the Spanish–American War, and stricken in 1912
 , the lead ship of her class of destroyers, commissioned in 1936, served in World War II and sunk in battle in October 1942
 , an  guided missile destroyer, commissioned in 1999 and actively serving 

Another ship with a similar name:
 

United States Navy ship names